Nikolai Alexandrovich Khovrin (1891 – 1972) was a Russian and Soviet military leader who headed Baltic sailor formations during the October Revolution.

Life and career
Born on 7 October 1891 in Saint Petersburg, since 1912 Khovrin served in the Baltic Fleet, and he was a member of the Russian Social Democratic Labour Party since 1915.

In 1917 he participated in the February Revolution and was a member of the Bolsheviks Gelsingfors Committee, one of founders and a member of the Central Committee of the Baltic Fleet (Tsentrobalt). During the October Revolution, Khovrin was a commissar of the Tsentrobalt, participated in the assault of the Winter Palace, destroying the Kerensky–Krasnov uprising, and was a member of the 2nd All-Russian Congress of Soviets. On 13 November 1917 he led his sailors to crush anti-Bolshevik resistance in Moscow.

In 1918 Khovrin was appointed a commander of the Petrograd Naval Base and participated in Soviet invasion of Ukraine as part of the Ukrainian-Soviet War and eventually he was appointed a commander of the Kerch Naval Base.

After the Russian Civil War, Khovrin served at the EPRON, the People's Commissariat of Navy and the Soviet Army. He was a veteran of World War II. In 1951 Khovrin retired and lived in Kiev before his death in 1972.

Bibliography
 Khovrin, N.A. Baltic sailors assault! Moscow: "Voyenizdat", 1987.

External links
Nikolai Khovrin at the Great Soviet Encyclopedia
Nikolai Khovrin at the History of CCCR website
Nikolai Khovrin Web archive link.

1891 births
1972 deaths
Bolsheviks
Military personnel from Saint Petersburg
Russian military leaders
Russian sailors
Soviet people of the Ukrainian–Soviet War
Red Guards (Russia)